Yi Han-eung (Korean:이한응, Hanja:李漢應, 30 October 1874 — 12 May 1905) was a Korean diplomat in London, UK. He served as Charge d'Affaires of the Korean Emperor Gojong to the UK and Italy when the Korean Peninsula was about to be occupied by the Japanese. He made efforts to keep his nation independent in the era of imperialism, but eventually committed suicide in his office on Trebovir Road in London in May 1905, when it became apparent that Korea would lose its status as an independent nation.

Early life
Yi Han-eung was born on 30 Oct 1874, as a second child to Yi Myung Ho, in the city of Yong-In in Kyung-gi Province.

At the age of 25, he entered the national English school, and graduated after two years. In 1894, he passed the national exam for Sungkyunkwan Jinsa. In 1897, he was appointed as  Jusa, and started his career as a civil servant. In 1899, he was appointed as an English instructor and started to teach young students.

Life in London

In 1901, Yi Han-eung was appointed a 3rd rank secretary of the consulate general for the United Kingdom and Italy, and moved to the London office accompanying the minister Min Yong Ton.

In 1903,  returned to Korea, but no successor was appointed. As of early 1904, Yi Han-eung took charge of the legation office as a Charge d'Affaires. He visited the British Foreign Minister's office on 13 Jan 1904, and submitted a memorandum explaining his own view on geo-political situation around the Korean Peninsula using his own diagram shown on the right.

Office building of the Korean legation 

Yi Han Eung departed Korea on 15 April 1901, and arrived in London around 24 June 1901. Six members of the Korean Legation including Min Yong-ton and Yi Han-eung found temporary residence on Queen Victoria Street, before they finally moved to 4 Trebovir Road, Earl's Court.

It is a four-story Victorian townhouse building with a basement, built in 1879 by the Van Camps from Belgium. Currently there is no sign installed that commemorates the diplomatic heritage, but the Korean Embassy has been trying to raise awareness on the historic importance of this building. A Blue plaque proposal for this building has also been submitted.

Vaughan Williams family, close friend to the Korean legation 
It has recently been found that one particular family, headed by Lord Justice Sir Roland Vaughan Williams and Lady Laura Vaughan Williams, has shown tremendous generosity to the Korean legation. It appeared in a message sent on behalf of the Korean Emperor Gojong, that the kindness shown to Yi had 'revealed to His Majesty a new and pleasing side of western character and had touched him very deeply.'

The Vaughan Williams family have lived in 6 Trebovir Rd, next to the Korean legation office building. They have shown tremendous support to the Korean legation, and sometimes invited Korean legation members to their family estate called 'High Ashes' located in Leith Hill, Surrey, in order to entertain them.

Death

As an acting minister to the UK, Yi Han-eung contacted the British Foreign Office in London and asked for intervention in peace negotiations. However, Lord Lansdowne refused any talk with Yi Han Eung, as the UK had a common interest with Japan through Anglo-Japanese Alliance signed in 1902.
He once again requested the British Foreign Office for intervention in peace negotiations on 22 March 1905, but Lord Lansdowne did nothing other than acknowledging the receipt of his memorandum on 1 April 1905. Having failed to secure British support, on 12 May 1905, Yi committed suicide in his bedroom at 4 Trebovir Rd to take responsibility for it. After this, the Korean embassy in London was disestablished.

Recognition by Korean Government

 Nov 1905 : Gojong expressed his condolences by writing, and bestowed Yi Han Eung a posthumous title of Naebuhyuppan.
 1962 : Korean medal of honor was bestowed.
 1964 : A memorial monument was built in Jangchungdan park, Seoul.
 May 1995 : Official ceremony held commemorating 90th year since Yi Han Eung's death
 May 2005 : Official ceremony and research conference held commemorating 100th year since Yi Han Eung's death

 May 2015 : Research conference held commemorating 110th year since Yi Han Eung's death, Seoul Press Center

References 

Korean diplomats
Korean independence activists
1874 births
1905 deaths
Officials of the Korean Empire
Suicides by poison in South Korea
19th-century Korean people
20th-century Korean people
People from Yongin